Reinier is the Dutch form of the Germanic masculine given name Raginheri,  composed of the two elements ragin ("advice") and heri ("army"). It is equivalent to Scandinavian Ragnar, German Rainer, French Rainier, and Spanish and Italian Raniero. An archaic spelling is Reynier or Reijnier. People with the name Reinier include:

Reinier
 Reinier Alcántara (born 1982), Cuban footballer
 Reinier Asmoredjo (born 1962), Surinamese artist
 Reinier Cornelis Bakhuizen van den Brink (born 1881), Dutch biologist
 Reinier Cornelis Bakhuizen van den Brink (born 1911), Dutch biologist, and son of the above.
 Reinier Beeuwkes (1884–1963), Dutch footballer
 Reinier Blom (1867–1943), Dutch gymnast
 Reinier Boitet (1691–1758), Dutch publisher and writer
 Reinier Butöt, Dutch curler
 Reinier Camminga (fl. 1300-1306), Governor of Friesland
 Reinier Craeyvanger (1812–1880), Dutch painter and etcher
 Reinier Estpinan (born 1982), Cuban sport shooter
 Reinier de Graaf (1641–1673), Dutch physician and anatomist 
 Reinier de Graaf (architect) (born 1964), Dutch architect
 Reinier Groenendaal (born 1951), Dutch cyclo-crosser
 Reinier Honig (born 1983), Dutch racing cyclist
 Reinier Jesus Carvalho (born 2002), Brazilian footballer
 Reinier Kreijermaat (1935–2018), Dutch footballer
 Reinier Leers (1654–1714), Dutch publisher 
 Reinier Nooms (c. 1623–1667), Dutch maritime painter a.k.a. as Reinier Zeeman
 Reinier van Oldenbarnevelt (c.1588–1623), Dutch political figure, son of Johan van Oldenbarnevelt
 Reinier Paping (born 1931), Dutch speed skater, winner of the Elfstedentocht of 1963
 (1564–1636), Dutch merchant and mayor of Amsterdam
 Reinier van Persijn (1615–1668), Dutch engraver of portraits and bookplates
 Reinier Por (died 1653), Dutch governor of Mauritius
 Reinier Robbemond (born 1972), Dutch football player and manager
 Reinier Rojas (born 1986), Cuban volleyball player
 Reinier Saxton (born 1988), Dutch golfer
 Reinier Johannes Charles Smits (born 1953), Dutch linguist
 Reinier van Tzum (c.1605–1670), Dutch merchant and official of the Dutch East India Company
 Reinier Vinkeles (1741–1816), Dutch painter and engraver
 Reinier Wilhelmus Welschen (1941–2013), Dutch Labour Party politician
Reynier
Reynier Anslo (1622–1669), Dutch poet
Reynier Casamayor Griñán (b. 1975), Cuban musician and medical doctor
Reynier Covyn (1632–1681), Dutch genre painter
Reynier van Gherwen (1620–1662), Dutch painter
Reynier Hals (1627–1672), Dutch painter, son of Frans Hals
Reynier de Klerck (1710–1780), Governor-General of the Dutch East Indies
Reynier Mena (b. 1996), Cuban sprinter
 Reynier Schaets (d. 1691), surgeon and justice at Schenectady, New York, where he died in the Schenectady Massacre
Reynier van Rooyen (b. 1990), South African rugby player
Reynier Jacob Wortendyke Jr. (1895–1975), United States federal judge
Renyer
Renyer (b. 2003), Brazilian footballer

See also
 Rainer (disambiguation)
 Reginar
 Regnier (disambiguation)
 Reynier (disambiguation)
 Renyer

Dutch masculine given names